The Adams School is a historic school in Findlay, Ohio, United States.  Built in 1888, it was listed on the National Register of Historic Places in 2004.  It has since been converted into an apartment building.

References 

School buildings completed in 1888
Apartment buildings in Ohio
School buildings on the National Register of Historic Places in Ohio
Italianate architecture in Ohio
Findlay, Ohio
Buildings and structures in Hancock County, Ohio
National Register of Historic Places in Hancock County, Ohio
1888 establishments in Ohio